Universal Indicator is the group name for Rephlex Records artists, Richard D. James (as Martin Tresidder) and Mike Dred (a.k.a. The Kosmik Kommando). The name is a reference to the signature acid techno sound found on all the releases. Five projects were released, and a compilation CD was mixed by Dred.

All the albums are named after different colours used on the UI spectrum. They were released in the following order: Blue, Red, Yellow, and Green. Blue and Yellow were produced by Dred, while Red and Green are often attributed to James, though never officially.

Discography

References

British electronic music groups